Sri Sathya Sai Arts is an Indian film production company established by K. K. Radhamohan.

Film production

References 

Film production companies based in Hyderabad, India
Year of establishment missing